The United Kingdom participated in the Eurovision Song Contest 2002 with the song "Come Back" written by Martyn Baylay. The song was performed by Jessica Garlick. The British entry for the 2002 contest in Tallinn, Estonia, was selected via the national final A Song for Europe 2002, organised by the British broadcaster BBC. Eight acts competed in the national final which consisted of a semi-final and a final, during which the winner was selected entirely through a public televote.

In the final of the Eurovision Song Contest, the United Kingdom performed in position 2 and placed 3rd out of the 24 participating countries with 111 points.

Background

Prior to the 2002 contest, the United Kingdom has participated in the Eurovision Song Contest forty-four times. Thus far, the United Kingdom has won the contest five times: in 1967 with the song "Puppet on a String" performed by Sandie Shaw, in 1969 with the song "Boom Bang-a-Bang" performed by Lulu, in 1976 with the song "Save Your Kisses for Me" performed by Brotherhood of Man, in 1981 with the song "Making Your Mind Up" performed by Bucks Fizz and in 1997 with the song "Love Shine a Light" performed by Katrina and the Waves. To this point, the nation is noted for having finished as the runner-up in a record fifteen contests. Up to and including 1998, the UK had only twice finished outside the top 10, in 1978 and 1987. Since 1999, the year in which the rule was abandoned that songs must be performed in one of the official languages of the country participating, the UK has had less success, having yet to finish within the top ten. For the 2001 contest, the United Kingdom finished in fifteenth place out of twenty-three competing entries with the song "No Dream Impossible" performed by Lindsay Dracass.

The British national broadcaster, BBC, broadcasts the event within the United Kingdom and organises the selection process for the nation's entry. BBC announced that the United Kingdom would participate in the Eurovision Song Contest 2002 on 13 August 2001. BBC has traditionally organised a national final featuring a competition among several artists and songs to choose the British entry for Eurovision. For their 2002 entry, the broadcaster announced that a national final involving a public vote would be held to select United Kingdom's entry.

Before Eurovision

A Song for Europe 2002 

A Song for Europe 2002 was the national final developed by the BBC in order to select the British entry for the Eurovision Song Contest 2002. Eight acts competed in the competition which consisted of a semi-final between 28 January and 1 February 2002, and a televised final on 3 March 2002. The semi-final was broadcast on BBC Radio 2, while the final was broadcast on BBC One.

Competing entries 
On 13 August 2001, BBC and the British Academy of Songwriters, Composers and Authors (BASCA) announced an open submission for interested artists to submit their songs. A fee was also imposed on songs being submitted to the national final, with £47 for BASCA members and £70.50 for non-BASCA members. The submission period lasted until 19 October 2001. The 550 received submissions were reviewed by a professional panel consisting of representatives of the BASCA that ultimately selected eight semi-finalists to compete in the national final.

Semi-final
The eight competing acts were premiered during The Ken Bruce Show and Wake Up to Wogan on BBC Radio 2 on 28 January 2002, and the public was able to vote for their favourite song through televoting and online voting until 31 January 2002. The top four songs that proceeded to the final were announced on 1 February 2002. "Never in a Million Years" performed by Zee was initially selected to proceed to the final, however the song was disqualified, as the song had been previously released in Hungary in 2001, and replaced with "I Give In", which had originally placed fifth.

Final
Four acts competed in the televised final on 3 March 2002 held at the BBC Elstree Studios in Borehamwood, Hertfordshire and hosted by Claire Sweeney and Christopher Price. A public televote selected the winner, "Come Back" performed by Jessica Garlick. The public vote in the final registered 107,298 votes.

At Eurovision
As a member of the "Big Four", the United Kingdom automatically qualified to compete in the Eurovision Song Contest 2002 on 25 May 2002. During the running order draw on 9 November 2001, the United Kingdom was designated to perform in position 2, following the entry from Cyprus and before the entry from Austria. The United Kingdom came third in the final, scoring 111 points.

In the United Kingdom, the show was televised on BBC One with commentary by Terry Wogan, on BBC Choice with commentary by Jenny Eclair, and broadcast on BBC Radio 2 with commentary by Ken Bruce. Christopher Price was initially announced as the commentator on BBC Choice (as part of the programme Liquid Eurovision Party), however he was replaced by Eclair following his death a month before the contest. The British spokesperson, who announced the British votes during the final, was Colin Berry.

Voting 
Below is a breakdown of points awarded to the United Kingdom and awarded by the United Kingdom in the contest. The nation awarded its 12 points to Malta in the contest.

References

External links
UK National Final 2002
A Song for Europe 2002 OGAE UK

2002
Countries in the Eurovision Song Contest 2002
Eurovision
Eurovision